Andrei Kuznetsov (23 April 1966 in Poltava, Ukraine – 30 December 1994 in Chieti, Italy), 196 cm tall, was a Russian volleyball player who competed for the Soviet Union in the 1988 Summer Olympics and for the Unified Team in the 1992 Summer Olympics.

In 1988 he was part of the Soviet team which won the silver medal in the Olympic tournament. He played all seven matches.

Four years later he finished seventh with the Unified Team in the 1992 Olympic tournament. He played all eight matches.

On 30 December 1994, he died in a road accident in Chieti.

Since 1996, Sport Express has presented him as the best volleyball champion of Russia.

References

 profile retrieved 29 August 2010

1966 births
Russian men's volleyball players
Ukrainian men's volleyball players
Soviet men's volleyball players
Olympic volleyball players of the Soviet Union
Olympic volleyball players of the Unified Team
Volleyball players at the 1988 Summer Olympics
Volleyball players at the 1992 Summer Olympics
Olympic silver medalists for the Soviet Union
Road incident deaths in Italy
1994 deaths
Olympic medalists in volleyball
Sportspeople from Poltava
Medalists at the 1988 Summer Olympics